Matthew Leslie Webb (born 24 September 1976) is an English former professional footballer born in Bristol who played in the Football League for Birmingham City. Webb, a pacy winger, joined Birmingham City as a YTS trainee in 1993 and turned professional two years later. After playing only once for the reserve team, he made his debut in Division Two on 11 March 1995, coming on as substitute for Steve McGavin in a 1–0 defeat at home to Swansea City. He remained with the club for the 1995–96 season, but played no more first-team football before being released from his contract in 1996.

References

1976 births
Living people
Footballers from Bristol
English footballers
Association football wingers
Birmingham City F.C. players
English Football League players